The Smithton School District is located in Smithton, a city in Pettis County in the United States state of Missouri.

History
The school opened on 23 December 1912, and the Smithton School District has since become the heart of the town. The current principal is  Jon Peterson. This district has a grade span of K-12. The school's athletic teams are known as the Tigers.

Board members

Bybee, Eddie    (2017)     President
Brown, Jason    (2016)     Vice President
Nesler, Steven          Treasurer
Barnes, Linda           Secretary
Williams, Becky (2016)
Frazee, John    (2017)
Moore, Sarah    (2017)
Asbury, Kyle    (2018)
Wehrman, Greg   (2018)

Administrators
Superintendent: Matt Teeter, Ed. D.
High School Principal: Jonathan Peterson
Middle School Principal: Brandon Wallace
Elementary Principal: Dawn McNeeley
Special Education Director: Cindy Snow

References

External links
 

School districts in Missouri
Schools in Pettis County, Missouri
School districts established in 1912